Airside Retail Park is a retail park that opened in 2001 in Swords, Dublin, close to Dublin Airport. An extension was built in 2005, which doubled the size of the park and included a new recycling centre. As of October 2018, there were 30 shops and businesses based at the site.

Work began in 2015 on a new Tesco near the Holywell Estate, which opened in 2017, creating around 85 new jobs. A €2.7 million expansion was completed in 2020, adding new services for customers.

Gallery

References 

Retail parks in the Republic of Ireland
Swords, Dublin